Blackall Range road network is a group of roads that provide access to the mountain localities and towns from various lowland places, and enable travel between the mountain communities. The network ensures continuity of access in times of flooding or other natural disasters, and during planned maintenance activities. The area serviced by the network includes the localities and towns, from south to north, of Maleny, Montville and Mapleton. It also includes the rural localities of Bald Knob, Balmoral Ridge, Flaxton, Gheerulla, North Maleny, Obi Obi and Witta. The area hosts a substantial residential community plus many tourism accommodation venues.

Located to the west of the Sunshine Coast in Queensland, Australia, the Blackall Range is also a popular day-trip destination.

Roads in the network
The network consists of the following state-controlled roads:

A number of local roads that also access the range are not included in this article.

Landsborough–Maleny Road

Landsborough–Maleny Road is a state-controlled district road (number 494). Almost all of this road is part of Tourist Drive 23. 

The road runs generally north-west from Landsborough, ascending the south-eastern slope of the Blackall Range.

Major intersections (Landsborough-Maleny Road)
All distances are from Google Maps. The entire road is within the Sunshine Coast local government area.

Maleny–Kenilworth Road

Maleny–Kenilworth Road is a state-controlled district road (number 495). This road is part of Tourist Drive 22. 

The road descends the south-western slope of the Blackall Range and then follows the Mary River valley north to Kenilworth.

A project to widen sections of the road in Conondale and Cambroon, at a cost of $4.9 million, was expected to complete late in 2022.

Major intersections (Maleny–Kenilworth Road)
All distances are from Google Maps. The entire road is within the Sunshine Coast local government area.

Maleny–Montville Road

Within the locality of Montville this road is known as Balmoral Road. It is part of Tourist Drive 23. There are no major intersections on this road. 

The road runs from south to north along the eastern edge of the Blackall Range.

Maleny–Stanley River Road

Maleny–Stanley River Road is a state-controlled district road (number 493) rated as a local road of regional significance (LRRS). The first section of this road, within the locality of Maleny, is part of Tourist Drive 23. 

The roads runs down a ridge to the south-west of Maleny, crosses the headwaters of the Stanley River, then turns south-east and ascends a ridge of the Conondale Range to Peachester.

Major intersections (Maleny–Stanley River Road)
All distances are from Google Maps. The entire road is within the Sunshine Coast local government area.

Montville–Mapleton Road

Montville–Mapleton Road is a state-controlled district road (number 499) rated as a local road of regional significance (LRRS). This road is also known as Flaxton Drive. It is part of Tourist Drive 23. 

The road runs from south to north along the eastern edge of the Blackall Range.

Major intersections (Montville–Mapleton Road)
All distances are from Google Maps. The entire road is within the Sunshine Coast local government area.

Nambour–Mapleton Road

Nambour–Mapleton Road is a state-controlled district road (number 496) rated as a local road of regional significance (LRRS).

The road runs generally west from Nambour, ascending the north-eastern slope of the Blackall Range.

Major intersections (Nambour–Mapleton Road)
All distances are from Google Maps. The entire road is within the Sunshine Coast local government area.

Obi Obi Road

Obi Obi Road is a state-controlled district road (number 4962) rated as a local road of regional significance (LRRS). There are no major intersections on this road. 

The road descends the north-western slope of the Blackall Range and then follows the valley of Obi Obi Creek north-west to Kenilworth.

Part of this road is split between uphill and downhill sections. The downhill section is mostly unsealed.

Woombye–Montville Road

Woombye–Montville Road is a state-controlled district road (number 498) rated as a local road of regional significance (LRRS). This road is also known as Woombye–Palmwoods Road and Palmwoods–Montville Road. 

The road runs generally south-west from Woombye, passing through Palmwwoods and following the valley of Paynter Creek to the foot of the eastern escarpment of the Blackall Range, which it ascends  by a circuitous route.

Major intersections (Woombye–Montville Road)
All distances are from Google Maps. The entire road is within the Sunshine Coast local government area.

Tourist Drive 23
Tourist Drive 23 follows Landsborough–Maleny Road until it reaches an intersection with Mountain View Road as it enters Maleny. Here it turns south-west and continues in a generally west direction until it reaches an intersection with Maleny–Stanley River Road, where it turns north. It continues north until it reaches an intersection with Landsborough–Maleny Road (to the east) and Maleny–Kenilworth Road (to the north-west). Here it turns east and continues through the Maleny CBD and on until it reaches an intersection with Maleny–Montville Road.

Turning north it follows Maleny–Montville Road, Montville–Mapleton Road, and Nambour–Mapleton Road to its end in Nambour. Tourist Drive 23 continues across the Nambour Connection Road onto Nambour–Bli Bli Road, which it follows to the Bruce Highway.

History
A track linking Landsborough to Maleny was cut in 1880.

By 1922, "good" roads existed from Landsborough to Maleny and from Nambour to Mapleton and on to Montville. Plans were in hand to link Maleny to Montville and to build a new "first-class" road from Palmwoods to Montville.

Notes

References

Roads in Queensland